The Formula Volkswagen Germany was a short-lived single-seater category in Germany between 2001 and 2003.

History
The Formula Volkswagen was launched in 2000 as the new Formula Vee by Volkswagen Motorsport. Reynard Motorsports constructed the chassis while the engine was derived from the Volkswagen Formula 3 engine. The initial race was run at the Salzburgring on June 10, 2001. The race was won by Belgian youngster Philip Cloostermans. Cloostermans finished second in the standings of the first season, behind Walter Lechner Jr.. The following season an updated Formula Volkswagen chassis was presented. The new car had aerodynamic updates to more resemble the dimensions of a Formula 3 car. The racing format was also different for the 2002 season. Instead of one race each weekend, there were now two. The series struggled to attract more than fifteen competitors each weekend. Jaap van Lagen won the final season of the Formula Volkswagen in 2003.

Champions

References

Volkswagen Group
Formula racing
Sports in Salzburg
Formula Three races
Auto racing series in Germany
Recurring sporting events established in 2001
Recurring sporting events disestablished in 2003
Defunct auto racing series
Defunct sports competitions in Germany
2001 establishments in Germany
2003 disestablishments in Germany